The 1995 NAIA Division II men's basketball tournament  was the tournament held by the NAIA to determine the national champion of men's college basketball among its Division II members in the United States and Canada for the 1994–95 basketball season.

Bethel (IN) defeated hosts Northwest Nazarene in the championship game, 103–95 after overtime, to claim the Pilots' first NAIA national title.

The tournament was played at the Montgomery Fieldhouse at Northwest Nazarene University in Nampa, Idaho.

Qualification

The tournament field expanded for the second time in two years, increasing by eight teams from twenty-four to thirty-two teams. The top sixteen teams were now seeded, and no teams were given a bye into the second round. 

The tournament continued to utilize a single-elimination format.

Bracket

See also
1995 NAIA Division I men's basketball tournament
1995 NCAA Division I men's basketball tournament
1995 NCAA Division II men's basketball tournament
1995 NCAA Division III men's basketball tournament
1995 NAIA Division II women's basketball tournament

References

NAIA
NAIA Men's Basketball Championship
1995 in sports in Idaho